Wisk'achayuq (Quechua: wisk'acha viscacha, -yuq a suffix, "the one with the viscachas", also spelled Huisca Chayoc, Huiscachayoc, Huiscachayocc, Viscachayoc, Viscachayocc, Viscachayoj, Vizcachayoc, Vizcachayocc, Vizcachayoj, Wiscachayo) may refer to:

 Wisk'achayuq (Apurímac), a mountain in the Apurímac Region, Peru
 Wisk'achayuq (Bolivia), a mountain in Bolivia
 Wisk'achayuq (Huancavelica), a mountain in the Huancavelica Region, Peru

See also 
 Wisk'acha
 Wisk'achani (disambiguation)